Dolev Azulay is an Israeli footballer who plays Maccabi Petah Tikva.

Career
Azulay started his career in Hapoel Nazareth Illit's youth teams. On 2 November 2015, he made his debut on the 1-1 draw against Hapoel Afula. On 12 January 2018, scored his debut goal in the 4-2 win against Hapoel Hadera.

On 23 July 2018, signed in the Israeli Premier League club Maccabi Netanya.

On 16 June 2021, Azulay returned to Hapoel Nof HaGalil.

Career statistics

References

External links
 

1997 births
Living people
Israeli footballers
Footballers from Northern District (Israel)
People from Tzippori
Hapoel Nof HaGalil F.C. players
Maccabi Netanya F.C. players
Maccabi Petah Tikva F.C. players
Liga Leumit players
Israeli Premier League players
Association football defenders